Yale–Cariboo was a federal electoral district in British Columbia, Canada, that was represented in the House of Commons of Canada from 1896 to 1917.

This riding was created in 1896 by combining the former Yale and Cariboo ridings.  A redistribution in 1903 split off the eastern portion of the riding as the Kootenay riding from the Yale portion of Yale–Cariboo.  It was abolished in 1914 and the Yale riding name restored, although on a smaller scale and actually without the town of Yale in the riding (it was in Fraser Valley), and also excluding Salmon Arm and Kamloops, which were part of the Cariboo portion of Yale–Cariboo, were reassigned to the Cariboo riding.

Major communities in the riding 

Thompson:

Savona
Kamloops

Shuswap:

Salmon Arm
Falkland

Okanagan:
Vernon
Kelowna
Penticton
Osoyoos
Oliver
Enderby
Armstrong
Summerland
Coldstream
Cherryville

Boundary Country:

Greenwood
Grand Forks
Rock Creek
Eholt (Midway)

The following communities were split off from Yale–Cariboo in the redistribution of 1903, to form the new riding of Kootenay.

Castlegar
Rossland
Trail
Ymir
Nelson
Sandon
New Denver
Kaslo
Nakusp
Revelstoke
Golden
Invermere
Kimberley
Cranbrook
Fernie
Sparwood
Yahk
Creston
Salmo

Nicola-Similkameen:

Keremeos
Hedley
Princeton
Merritt
Douglas Lake
Tulameen
Coalmont (Granite City)
Aspen Grove

Members of Parliament 
This riding elected the following Members of Parliament:

Election results

See also 

 List of Canadian federal electoral districts
 Past Canadian electoral districts

External links 
Riding history from the Library of Parliament
 Census of Canada, 1911, Yale-Cariboo (ArchiviaNet) - includes detailed list of contemporary communities in riding.

Former federal electoral districts of British Columbia